This is a summary of 1978 in music in the United Kingdom.

Events
14 January - The Sex Pistols played their final show (until a reunion in 1996), at Winterland, San Francisco.
24 January - Wings' "Mull of Kintyre" made No.1 for its ninth (and final) week - becoming the biggest-selling single in UK history at that point.
25 January - Electric Light Orchestra kicked off their Out of the Blue world tour in Honolulu, Hawaii.
11 March - Kate Bush became the first female solo artist to reach number one in the UK charts with a self-written song ("Wuthering Heights").
30 April - The Clash, Tom Robinson Band, Steel Pulse, X-Ray Spex, the Ruts, Misty in Roots and Generation X all play live in Victoria Park, Hackney at the Anti-Nazi League/Rock Against Racism festival, following a march from Trafalgar Square.
25 May - The Who played their last show with Keith Moon.
15 July - The Picnic at Blackbushe Aerodrome, Camberley, Surrey, a concert featuring Bob Dylan, Eric Clapton and Joan Armatrading, attracted some 200,000 people.
30 July - Thin Lizzy officially announced that Gary Moore had replaced Brian Robertson on guitar.
18 August - The Who released their eighth studio Who Are You. It is The Who's last album with Keith Moon as the drummer; Moon died twenty days after the release of this album.
September - Second anti-racism event staged in Brockwell Park, South London, featuring Elvis Costello, Stiff Little Fingers and Aswad, with 150,000 attending.
27 November - Def Leppard's permanent drummer Rick Allen joined the band at the age of 15.
December - UB40 formed.
The Bee Gees' Saturday Night Fever became the biggest-selling album of all time (until overtaken in 1983).
First BBC Young Musician of the Year competition for classical players won by trombonist Michael Hext.
Operatic contralto Helen Watts is appointed a CBE.
Multitone Records is founded by Pranil Gohil and specializing in bhangra style music.

Charts

Number one singles

Number one albums

Year-end charts
The tables below include sales between 31 December 1977 and 30 December 1978: the year-end charts reproduced in the issue of Music Week dated 23 December 1978 and played on Radio 1 on 31 December 1978 only include sales figures up until 16 December 1978.

Best-selling singles

Best-selling albums

Notes:

Classical music: new works
Malcolm Arnold - Symphony No. 8
Peter Maxwell Davies - Symphony no. 1
Daniel Jones - String Quartet No 4
Malcolm Williamson
Azure
Fiesta

Film and Incidental music
Tony Banks - The Shout, starring Alan Bates, Susannah York and John Hurt.
Roy Budd - The Wild Geese.
Ron Goodwin - Force 10 from Navarone directed by Guy Hamilton, starring Robert Shaw and Edward Fox.
Ed Welch - The Thirty Nine Steps, starring Robert Powell.

Births
1 January - Tarik O'Regan, composer
3 January - Luke Manning, co-founder of Mostar Records
13 January - Shelley Nash, singer (Girls@Play)
15 January - Sandi Lee Hughes, singer (allSTARS*)
19 January - Wayne Williams, singer (Another Level)
13 February - Hamish Glencross, Scottish guitarist
14 February - Ryan Griffiths (The Vines)
22 February - Jenny Frost, singer (Atomic Kitten)
6 April - Myleene Klass, singer (Hear'Say), radio and TV presenter
7 April - Duncan James, singer (Blue)
9 April - Rachel Stevens, singer (S Club 7)
16 April - Terry Daly, Irish singer (Mytown)
28 April - Lauren Laverne, singer, radio DJ and TV presenter
4 May - Matthew Rose, bass
22 May - Jordan, model and would-be singer
29 May - Adam Rickitt, singer
6 June - Sophie Solomon, violinist
16 June - Elisa Cariera, American-born singer (Solid HarmoniE)
4 July - Stephen McNally, English singer-songwriter (BBMak)
15 September - David Sneddon, singer-songwriter
27 September - Jamie Benson, singer (Hepburn)
7 October - Alesha Dixon, singer (Mis-Teeq)
9 October
Nicky Byrne, Irish singer (Westlife)
Beverley Fullen, drummer (Hepburn)
27 October - Sabrina Washington, singer (Mis-Teeq)
1 November - Bobak Kianovsh, singer (Another Level)
7 November - Mark Read, singer (A1)
27 November - Mike Skinner, rapper, musician and record producer
12 December - Paul Walker, Irish singer (Mytown)
18 December - Lindsay Armaou, Greek-born Irish-based singer (B*Witched)

Deaths
11 January - William John Edwards, Cerdd Dant singer (b. 1898)
15 January - Jack Jackson, trumpeter, bandleader and radio disc jockey (b. 1906)
24 February - Mrs Mills, pianist (b. 1918)
9 March - L. Radley Flynn, singer and actor (b. 1902)
12 March - Tolchard Evans, songwriter, composer, pianist and bandleader (b. 1901)
3 April - Ray Noble, composer and bandleader (b. 1903)
21 April - Sandy Denny, singer (Fairport Convention) (b. 1947) (cerebral haemorrhage)
14 August - Victor Silvester, dance band leader (b. 1900)
7 September
Keith Moon, drummer for The Who (b. 1946) (Clomethiazole overdose)
Charles Williams, composer (b. 1893)
15 September - Robert Bruce Montgomery, composer (b. 1921)
13 November - W. S. Gwynn Williams, musician and composer (b. 1896)

See also 
 1978 in British radio
 1978 in British television
 1978 in the United Kingdom
 List of British films of 1978

References 

 
British music by year